Clermont-Ferrand is a city and commune of France, in the Auvergne-Rhône-Alpes region, with a population of 146,734 (2018). Its metropolitan area (aire d'attraction) had 504,157 inhabitants at the 2018 census. It is the prefecture (capital) of the Puy-de-Dôme department. Olivier Bianchi is its current mayor.

Clermont-Ferrand sits on the plain of Limagne in the Massif Central and is surrounded by a major industrial area. The city is known for the chain of volcanoes, the Chaîne des Puys, which surround it. This includes the dormant volcano Puy de Dôme, one of the highest in the surrounding area, which is topped by communications towers and visible from the city. Clermont-Ferrand has been listed as a "tectonic hotspot" since July 2018 on the UNESCO World Heritage List.

One of the oldest French cities, it has been known by Greeks as the capital of the Arvernie Tribe before developing under the Gallo-Roman era under the name of Augustonemetum in the 1st century BC. The forum of the Roman city was located on the top of the Clermont mound, on the site of the present cathedral. During the decline of the Western Roman Empire it was subjected to repeated looting by the peoples who invaded Gaul, including Vandals, Alans, Visigoths and Franks. It was later raided by Vikings during the weakening of the Carolingian Empire in the Early Middle Ages. Growing in importance under the Capetian dynasty, in 1095 it hosted the Council of Clermont, where Pope Urban II called the First Crusade. In 1551, Clermont became a royal town, and further made in 1610, inseparable property of the Crown.

Today Clermont-Ferrand hosts the Clermont-Ferrand International Short Film Festival (Festival du Court-Métrage de Clermont-Ferrand), one of the world's leading international festivals for short films. It is also home to the corporate headquarters of Michelin, the global tyre company founded there more than 100 years ago. With a quarter of the municipal population being students, and 6,000 researchers, Clermont-Ferrand is the first city in France to join the UNESCO Learning City Network.

Along with its highly distinctive black lava stone Gothic Cathedral, Clermont-Ferrand's most famous site includes the public square Place de Jaude, on which stands a grand statue of Vercingetorix astride a warhorse and brandishing a sword. The inscription reads: J'ai pris les armes pour la liberté de tous (I took up arms for the liberty of all). This statue was sculpted by Frédéric Bartholdi, who also created the Statue of Liberty.

History

Name
Clermont-Ferrand's first name was Augustonemetum. It was born on the central knoll where the cathedral is situated today. It overlooked the capital of Gaulish Avernie. The fortified castle of Clarus Mons gave its name to the whole town in 848, to which the small episcopal town of Montferrand was attached in 1731, together taking the name of Clermont-Ferrand. The old part of Clermont is delimited by the route of the ramparts, as they existed at the end of the Middle Ages. The town of Clermont-Ferrand came about with the joining together of two separate towns, Clermont and Montferrand, which was decreed by Louis XIII and confirmed by Louis XV.

Prehistoric and Roman

Clermont ranks among the oldest cities of France. The first known mention was by the Greek geographer Strabo, who called it the "metropolis of the Arverni" (meaning their oppidum civitas or tribal capital). The city was at that time called Nemessos – a Gaulish word for a sacred forest, and was situated on the mound where the cathedral of Clermont-Ferrand stands today. Somewhere in the area around Nemossos the Arverni chieftain Vercingetorix (later to head a unified Gallic resistance to the Roman invasion led by Julius Caesar) was born around 72 BC. Also, Nemossos was situated not far from the plateau of Gergovia, where Vercingetorix repulsed the Roman assault at the Battle of Gergovia in 52 BC. After the Roman conquest, the city became known as Augustonemetum sometime in the 1st century, a name which combined its original Gallic name with that of the Emperor Augustus. Its population was estimated at 15,000–30,000 in the 2nd century, making it one of the largest cities of Roman Gaul. It then became Arvernis in the 3rd century, taking its name, like other Gallic cities in this era, from the people who lived within its walls.

Early Middle Ages
The city became the seat of a bishop in the 5th century, at the time of the bishop Namatius or Saint Namace, who built a cathedral here described by Gregory of Tours. Clermont went through a dark period after the disappearance of the Roman Empire and during the whole High Middle Ages, marked by pillaging by the peoples who invaded Gaul. Between 471 and 475, Auvergne was often the target of Visigothic expansion, and the city was frequently besieged, including once by Euric. Although defended by Sidonius Apollinaris, at the head of the diocese from 468 to 486, and the patrician Ecdicius, the city was ceded to the Visigoths by emperor Julius Nepos in 475 and remained part of the Visigothic kingdom until 507. A generation later, it became part of the Kingdom of the Franks. On 8 November 535 the first Council of Clermont opened at Arvernis (Clermont), with fifteen bishops participating, including Caesarius of Arles, Nizier of Lyons, Bishop of Trier, and Saint Hilarius, Bishop of Mende. The Council issued 16 decrees. The second canon reiterated the principle that the granting of episcopal dignity must be according to merit and not as a result of intrigues.

In 570, Bishop Avitus ordered the Jews of the city, who numbered over 500, to accept Christian baptism or be expelled.

In 848, the city was renamed Clairmont, after the castle Clarus Mons. During this era, it was an episcopal city ruled by its bishop. Clermont was not spared by the Vikings at the time of the weakening of the Carolingian Empire: it was ravaged by the Normans under Hastein or Hastingen in 862 and 864 and, while its bishop Sigon carried out reconstruction work, again in 898 (or 910, according to some sources). Bishop Étienne II built a new Romanesque cathedral which was consecrated in 946. It was almost entirely replaced by the current Gothic cathedral, though the crypt survives and the towers were only replaced in the 19th century.

Middle Ages

Clermont was the starting point of the First Crusade, in which Christendom sought to free Jerusalem from Muslim domination. Pope Urban II preached the crusade in 1095, at the Second Council of Clermont. In 1120, following repeated crises between the counts of Auvergne and the bishops of Clermont and in order to counteract the clergy's power, the counts founded the rival city of Montferrand on a mound next to the fortifications of Clermont, on the model of the new cities of the Midi that appeared in the 12th and 13th centuries. Until the early modern period, the two remained separate cities: Clermont, an episcopal city; Montferrand, a comital one.

Early Modern and Modern eras
Clermont became a royal city in 1551, and in 1610, the inseparable property of the French Crown. On 15 April 1630 the Edict of Troyes (the First Edict of Union) joined the two cities of Clermont and Montferrand. This union was confirmed in 1731 by Louis XV with the Second Edict of Union. At this time, Montferrand was no more than a satellite city of Clermont, and it remained so until the beginning of the 20th century. Wishing to retain its independence, Montferrand made three demands for independence, in 1789, 1848, and 1863.

In the 20th century, construction of the Michelin factories and of city gardens, which shaped modern Clermont-Ferrand, united the two cities, although two distinct downtowns survive and Montferrand retains a strong identity.

Geography

Climate 
Clermont-Ferrand has an oceanic climate (Cfb). The city is in the rain shadow of the Chaîne des Puys, giving it one of the driest climates in metropolitan France, except for a few places around the Mediterranean Sea. The mountains also block most of the oceanic influence of the Atlantic, which creates a climate much more continental than nearby cities west or north of the mountains, like Limoges and Montluçon. Thus the city has comparatively cold winters and hot summers. From November to March, frost is very frequent, and the city, being at the bottom of a valley, is frequently subject to temperature inversion, in which the mountains are sunny and warm, and the plain is freezing cold and cloudy. Snow is quite common, although usually short-lived and light. Summer temperatures often exceed , with sometimes violent thunderstorms. The highest temperature was reached in 2019 of 40.9 °C (105.6 °F) while the lowest was -29.0 °C (-20.2 °F).

Main sights

Religious architecture

Clermont-Ferrand has two famous churches. One is Notre-Dame du Port, a Romanesque church which was built during the 11th and 12th centuries (the bell tower and was rebuilt during the 19th century). It was nominated as a World Heritage Site by UNESCO in 1998. The other is Clermont-Ferrand Cathedral (Cathédrale Notre-Dame-de-l'Assomption de Clermont-Ferrand), built in Gothic style between the 13th and the 19th centuries.

Parks and gardens

 Jardin Lecoq
 Parc de Montjuzet
 Jardin botanique de la Charme
 Arboretum de Royat
 Jardin botanique d'Auvergne

Economy and infrastructure 
Food production and processing as well as engineering are major employers in the area, as are the many research facilities of major computer software and pharmaceutical companies.

The city's industry was for a long time linked to the French tyre manufacturer Michelin, which created the radial tyre and grew up from Clermont-Ferrand to become a worldwide leader in its industry. For most of the 20th century, it had extensive factories throughout the city, employing up to 30,000 workers. While the company has maintained its headquarters in the city, most of the manufacturing is now done in foreign countries. This downsizing took place gradually, allowing the city to court new investment in other industries, avoiding the fate of many post-industrial cities and keeping it a very wealthy and prosperous area home of many high-income executives.

Transport 

The main railway station has connections to Paris and several regional destinations: Lyon, Moulins via Vichy, Le Puy-en-Velay, Aurillac, Nîmes, Issoire, Montluçon and Thiers.

The motorway A71 connects Clermont-Ferrand with Orléans and Bourges, the A75 with Montpellier and the A89 with Bordeaux, Lyon and Saint-Étienne (A72). The airport offers flights within France. Recently, Clermont-Ferrand was France's first city to get a new Translohr transit system, the Clermont-Ferrand Tramway, thereby linking the city's north and south neighbourhoods.

The TGV will arrive in Auvergne after 2030. It will be one of the last regions to not have a TGV stop.

Population

Culture

Clermont-Ferrand was the home of mathematician and philosopher Blaise Pascal who tested Evangelista Torricelli's hypothesis concerning the influence of gas pressure on liquid equilibrium. This is the experiment where a vacuum is created in a mercury tube: Pascal's experiment had his brother-in-law carry a barometer to the top of the Puy-de-Dôme. The Université Blaise-Pascal (or Clermont-Ferrand II) was located primarily in the city and is named after him.

Clermont-Ferrand also hosts the Clermont-Ferrand International Short Film Festival, the world's first international short film festival which originated in 1979. This festival, which brings thousands of people every year (137,000 in 2008) to the city, is the second French film Festival after Cannes in term of visitors, but the first one regarding the number of spectators (in Cannes visitors are not allowed in theatres, only professionals). This festival has revealed many young talented directors now well known in France and internationally such as Mathieu Kassovitz, Cédric Klapisch and Éric Zonka.

Beside the short film festival, Clermont-Ferrand hosts more than twenty music, film, dance, theatre and video and digital art festivals every year. With more than 800 artistic groups from dance to music, Clermont-Ferrand and the Auvergne region's cultural life is important in France. One of the city's nicknames is "France's Liverpool". Groups such as The Elderberries and Cocoon were formed there.

Additionally, the city was the subject of the acclaimed documentary The Sorrow and the Pity, which used Clermont-Ferrand as the basis of the film, which told the story of France under Nazi occupation and the Vichy regime of Marshal Pétain. Pierre Laval, Pétain's "handman", was an Auvergnat.

My Night at Maud's, a 1969 French drama film by Éric Rohmer, was set and filmed in Clermont-Ferrand in and around Christmas Eve. It is the third film (fourth in order of release) in his series of Six Moral Tales. One of the main themes of the film concerns Pascal's Wager whose author was born in the city in 1623.

The city also hosts L'Aventure Michelin, the museum dedicated to the history of Michelin group.

Sport
A racing circuit, the Charade Circuit, close to the city, using closed-off public roads held the French Grand Prix in 1965, 1969, 1970 and 1972. It was a daunting circuit, with such harsh elevation changes that caused some drivers to be ill as they drove. Winners included Jim Clark, Jackie Stewart (twice), and Jochen Rindt.

Clermont-Ferrand has some experience in hosting major international sports tournaments such as the FIBA EuroBasket 1999. The city has been the finish of Tour de France stages in 1951 and 1959, and will host the start of the 2023 Tour de France Femmes.

The city is also host to a rugby union club competing at international level, ASM Clermont Auvergne, as well as Clermont Foot Auvergne, a football club that has competed in France's second division, Ligue 2, since the 2007–08 season. In 2021/22. they will compete in Ligue 1 for the first time in the history of the club.

In the sevens version of rugby union, Clermont-Ferrand has hosted the France Women's Sevens, the final event in each season's World Rugby Women's Sevens Series,  since 2016.

Famous people

Born in Clermont-Ferrand 

 Avitus (ca.385 – ca.456), Roman emperor from the West from 455 to 456,
 Fadela Amara (born 1964), feminist and politician
 
 Martine Blanc (born 1944) an author and illustrator of ten books for children
 Antoine-Jean Bourlin (1752–1828), known as Dumaniant a comedian and goguettier.
 Thomas Cailley (born 1980) a French screenwriter and film director.
 Nicolas Chamfort (1741–1794), writer of epigrams and aphorisms.
 Étienne Clémentel (1864– 1936), politician, Govt. Minister and painter
 Cécile Coulon (born 1990) novelist, poet and short story writer.
 Jacques Delille (1738 in Aigueperse – 1813), translated Virgil’s Georgics and wrote a didactic poem on gardening.
 Lolo Ferrari (1963–2000), dancer, actress and singer with very large breast implants
 Gregory of Tours (ca.538 – 594) a Gallo-Roman historian and Bishop of Tours.
 Ginette Hamelin (1913–1944), French engineer and architect; member of the French resistance; died in a concentration camp
 Annelise Hesme (born 1976), actress and plays the cello and the piano.
 Thierry Laget (born 1959), writer, winner of the 1992 Prix Fénéon
 Edmond Lemaigre (1849–1890), composer and organist
 Antoine de Lhoyer (1768–1852), composer, guitarist and soldier
 Bernard Loiseau (1951– 2003), celebrity chef
 François-Bernard Mâche (born 1935), composer of contemporary music.
 Antoine François Marmontel (1816–1898) pianist and teacher at the Paris Conservatory
 Léon Melchissédec (1843-1925) baritone and teacher at the Paris Conservatory
 André Michelin (1853–1931) and Édouard Michelin (1859–1940), creators of the Michelin tyre group whose global headquarters are still located in Clermont-Ferrand
 Léonard Morel-Ladeuil (1820-1888), goldsmith and sculptor.
 George Onslow (1784–1853), composer, mainly of chamber music
 Victor Pachon (1867–1938), physiologist, worked on blood pressure
 Blaise Pascal (1623–1662), mathematician, physicist, and religious philosopher.
 Jacqueline Pascal (1625–1661)  child prodigy, composed verses, sister of Blaise Pascal.
 Dominique Perrault (born 1953), architect, designed the French National Library
 Henri Pognon (1853–1921), epigrapher, archaeologist and diplomat
 Henri Quittard (1864–1919),  composer, musicologist and music critic.
 François Dominique de Reynaud, Comte de Montlosier (1755–1838), politician and political writer.
 Peire Rogier (born ca.1145) an Auvergnat troubadour (fl. 1160 – 1180) and cathedral canon
 Audrey Tautou (born 1976), actress and model
 Pierre Teilhard de Chardin (1881–1955), philosopher, Jesuit priest and paleontologist

Sport 

 Chakir Ansari (born 1991),  Moroccan freestyle wrestler, competed at the 2016 Summer Olympics
 Laure Boulleau (born 1986), footballer with 216 club caps and 65 for France women 
 Patrick Depailler (1944–1980), Formula One driver
 Yves Dreyfus (1931–2021) epee fencer, bronze medalist at the 1956 Summer Olympics,
 Raphaël Géminiani (born 1925) a French former road bicycle racer.
 Jordan Lotiès (born 1984), footballer with 370 club caps
 Émile Mayade (1853–1898), a motoring pioneer and racing driver.
 Darline Nsoki (born 1989), basketball player
 Gabriella Papadakis (born 1995), ice dancer, Olympic medallist & World and European champion
 Émile Pladner (1906–1980) flyweight champion boxer, 104 wins, 16 losses and 13 draws. 
 Aurélien Rougerie (born 1980), rugby union player, with 417 club caps and 47 for France
 Christian Sarron (born 1955), Grand Prix motorcycle road racer
 Gauthier de Tessières (born 1981) a World Cup alpine ski racer

Resident in Clermont-Ferrand

 Sidonius Apollinaris (ca.430–after 489), Gallo-Roman poet, diplomat and bishop.
 Henri Bergson (1859–1941), philosopher
 Olivier Bianchi (born 1970) politician and Mayor of Clermont-Ferrand since 2014
 Paul Bourget (1852–1935), novelist and critic.
 Ivor Bueb (1923–1959) was a British professional sports car racing and Formula One driver.
 Anton Docher (1852–1928) "The Padre of Isleta", Roman Catholic priest, missionary and defender of the Indians lived in the pueblo of Isleta in the state of New Mexico for 34 years
 Valéry Giscard d'Estaing (1927-2020), lived in the city of Chamalières part of Clermont-Ferrand's metropolitan area, President of France from 1974 to 1981
 Claude Lanzmann (1925–2018), film maker, attended the Lycée Blaise-Pascal

Education 
Education is also an important factor in the economy of Clermont-Ferrand.

The University of Clermont Auvergne (formed in 2017 from a merger of Université Blaise Pascal and Université d'Auvergne) is located there and has a total student population of over 37,000, along with university faculty and staff.

With around 1,000 students SIGMA Clermont is the biggest engineering graduate school in the city.

A division of Polytech (an engineering school) located in Clermont-Ferrand made the news because two of its students, Laurent Bonomo and Gabriel Ferez, were murdered in June 2008 while enrolled in a program at Imperial College in London in what was to be known as the New Cross double murder.

The ESC Clermont Business School, created in 1919, is also located in the city.

Twin towns - sister cities
Clermont-Ferrand is twinned with:

 Aberdeen, Scotland, United Kingdom (since 1983)
 Braga, Portugal
 Gomel, Belarus
 Norman, Oklahoma, United States
 Oviedo, Spain
 Regensburg, Germany (since 1969)
 Salford, England, United Kingdom

See also
Communes of the Puy-de-Dôme department
Jaude Centre
List of works by Auguste Carli
List of twin towns and sister cities in France

References

Bibliography

External links

 Town hall website
 Tourist office 
 Unofficial Clermont-Ferrand website
 Joan of Arc's Letter to Clermont-Ferrand – Translation by Allen Williamson of an entry concerning Joan of Arc's letter to this city on 7 November 1429.

 
Communes of Puy-de-Dôme
Massif Central
Prefectures in France
Cities in France
Gallia Aquitania
Auvergne